Campylium is a genus of mosses belonging to the family Amblystegiaceae.

The genus was first described by William Starling Sullivant.

The genus has cosmopolitan distribution.

Species
This species list includes 44 accepted species of Campylium.

Campylium adscendens 
Campylium amblystegioides 
Campylium annamense 
Campylium bambergeri 
Campylium calcareum 
Campylium campylophylloides 
Campylium cardotii 
Campylium chrysophyllum 
Campylium courtoisii 
Campylium creperum 
Campylium decipiens 
Campylium fitz-geraldii 
Campylium glaucocarpoides 
Campylium gollanii 
Campylium hispidulum 
Campylium husnotii 
Campylium hygrophilum 
Campylium hylocomioides 
Campylium insubricum 
Campylium lacerulum 
Campylium laxifolium 
Campylium longicuspis 
Campylium pachytheca 
Campylium polymorphum
Campylium porphyreticum 
Campylium porphyreticum 
Campylium praegracile 
Campylium protensum 
Campylium pseudochrysophyllum 
Campylium pseudocomplexum 
Campylium pulchrum 
Campylium quisqueyanum 
Campylium radicale 
Campylium reichenbachianum 
Campylium rufo-chryseum 
Campylium serratifolium 
Campylium squarrosulum 
Campylium stellatum 
Campylium subdecursivulum 
Campylium tenerum 
Campylium treleasei 
Campylium trichocladum 
Campylium uninervium 
Campylium uninervium

References

Amblystegiaceae
Moss genera